The 2015 Clemson Tigers men's soccer team represents Clemson University during the 2015 NCAA Division I men's soccer season.  The Tigers are led by head coach Mike Noonan, in his sixth season.  They play home games at Riggs Field.  Riggs Field celebrated its 100-year anniversary this year, in October.  This is team's 55th season playing organized men's college soccer and their 28th playing in the Atlantic Coast Conference.

Roster

Updated 11/13/15 

Clemson had 7 players who received all ACC Honors  in the 2015 season.  Paul Clowes was named ACC Midfielder of the Year and to the all ACC first team.  Kyle Fisher was named ACC Defender of the Year and to the all ACC first team.  Andrew Tarbell and TJ Casner were named to the all ACC first team.  Oliver Shannon and Iman Mafi were named to the all ACC third team.  Patrick Bunk-Andersen was named to the all ACC freshman team.  Paul Clowes and Kyle Murphy were also named to the ACC All-Tournament team.  Paul Clowes and Andrew Tarbell were named Scholar All-Americans by the NSCAA.  Kyle Fisher was named to the TopDrawerSoccer Postseason Best XI First team, while Paul Clowes and Andrew Tarbell were named to the second team.  Patrick Bunk-Anderson was named to the Freshman Best XI Team.

Draft picks
The Tigers had four players drafted in the 2016 MLS SuperDraft.

Schedule

|-
!colspan=6 style=""| Exhibition

|-
!colspan=6 style=""| Regular season

|-
!colspan=6 style=""| ACC Tournament

|-
!colspan=6 style=""| NCAA Tournament

After finishing 2nd in the ACC Atlantic Division for the regular season, the Tigers received a first round bye in the ACC Tournament.  They defeated Boston College in the Quarterfinals, but lost to Syracuse in the Semifinals.  With this strong performance, the Tigers were seeded #2 overall in the NCAA tournament.  The Tigers beat Elon in the first round of the tournament.  With that win the Tigers advanced to the second round where they met UC Santa Barbara.  The Tigers recorded a 3–2 victory.  In the Quarterfinals of the NCAA Tournament, Clemson hosted 10th seeded Maryland.  Clemson advanced 3–-1 in the penalty shootout, after the game was tied 1–-1.  Clemson won its final four match over Syracuse in penalties after the match was tied 0–-0 after double overtime.  Clemson advanced to the championship match vs. Stanford.  The Tigers lost the Championship match 4–-0, finishing runners up in the NCAA tournament.

References

Clemson
Clemson Tigers men's soccer seasons
Clemson men's soccer
NCAA Division I Men's Soccer Tournament College Cup seasons
Clemson